Finding polynomial roots is a long-standing problem that has been the object of much research throughout history. A testament to this is that up until the 19th century, algebra meant essentially theory of polynomial equations.

Principles 

Finding the root of a linear polynomial (degree one) is easy and needs only one division: the general equation  has solution  For quadratic polynomials (degree two), the quadratic formula produces a solution, but its numerical evaluation may require some care for ensuring numerical stability. For degrees three and four, there are closed-form solutions in terms of radicals, which are generally not convenient for numerical evaluation, as being too complicated and involving the computation of several th roots whose computation is not easier than the direct computation of the roots of the polynomial (for example the expression of the real roots of a cubic polynomial may involve non-real cube roots). For polynomials of degree five or higher Abel–Ruffini theorem asserts that there is, in general, no radical expression of the roots.

So, except for very low degrees, root finding of polynomials consists of finding approximations of the roots. By the fundamental theorem of algebra, a polynomial of degree  has exactly  real or complex roots counting multiplicities.

It follows that the problem of root finding for polynomials may be split in three different subproblems;
 Finding one root
 Finding all roots
 Finding roots in a specific region of the complex plane, typically the real roots or the real roots in a given interval (for example, when roots represents a physical quantity, only the real positive ones are interesting).

For finding one root, Newton's method and other general iterative methods work generally well.

For finding all the roots, arguably the most reliable method is the Francis QR algorithm computing the eigenvalues of the Companion matrix corresponding to the polynomial, implemented as the standard method  in MATLAB. 

The oldest method of finding all roots is to start by finding a single root. When a root  has been found, it can be removed from the polynomial by dividing out the binomial . The resulting polynomial contains the remaining roots, which can be found by iterating on this process. However, except for low degrees, this does not work well because of the numerical instability: Wilkinson's polynomial shows that a very small modification of one coefficient may change dramatically not only the value of the roots, but also their nature (real or complex). Also, even with a good approximation, when one evaluates a polynomial at an approximate root, one may get a result that is far to be close to zero.

For avoiding these problems, methods have been elaborated, which compute all roots simultaneously, to any desired accuracy. Presently the most efficient method is Aberth method. A free implementation is available under the name of MPSolve. This is a reference implementation, which can find routinely the roots of polynomials of degree larger than 1,000, with more than 1,000 significant decimal digits.

The methods for computing all roots may be used for computing real roots. However, it may be difficult to decide whether a root with a small imaginary part is real or not. Moreover, as the number of the real roots is, on the average, the logarithm of the degree, it is a waste of computer resources to compute the non-real roots when one is interested in real roots.

The oldest method for computing the number of real roots, and the number of roots in an interval results from Sturm's theorem, but the methods based on Descartes' rule of signs and its extensions—Budan's and Vincent's theorems—are generally more efficient. For root finding, all proceed by reducing the size of the intervals in which roots are searched until getting intervals containing zero or one root. Then the intervals containing one root may be further reduced for getting a quadratic convergence of Newton's method to the isolated roots. The main computer algebra systems (Maple, Mathematica, SageMath, PARI/GP) have each a variant of this method as the default algorithm for the real roots of a polynomial.

The class of methods is based on converting the problem of finding polynomial roots to the problem of finding eigenvalues of the companion matrix of the polynomial, in principle, can use any eigenvalue algorithm to find the roots of the polynomial. However, for efficiency reasons one prefers methods that employ the structure of the matrix, that is, can be implemented in matrix-free form. Among these methods are the power method, whose application to the transpose of the companion matrix is the classical Bernoulli's method to find the root of greatest modulus. The inverse power method with shifts, which finds some smallest root first, is what drives the complex (cpoly) variant of the Jenkins–Traub algorithm and gives it its numerical stability. Additionally, it has fast convergence with order  (where  is the golden ratio) even in the presence of clustered roots.

Finding one root 
The most widely used method for computing a root is Newton's method, which consists of the iterations of the computation of 

by starting from a well-chosen value 

If  is a polynomial, the computation is faster when using Horner's method or evaluation with preprocessing for computing the polynomial and its derivative in each iteration.

Though the convergence is generally quadratic, it may converge much slowly or even not converge at all. However, if the polynomial has a real root, which is larger than the larger real root of its derivative, then Newton's method converges quadratically to this largest root if  is larger than this larger root (there are easy ways for computing an upper bound of the roots, see Properties of polynomial roots). This is the starting point of Horner method for computing the roots.

When one root  has been found, one may use Euclidean division for removing the factor  from the polynomial. Computing a root of the resulting quotient, and repeating the process provides, in principle, a way for computing all roots. However, this iterative scheme is numerically unstable; the approximation errors accumulate during the successive factorizations, so that the last roots are determined with a polynomial that deviates widely from a factor of the original polynomial. To reduce this error, one may, for each root that is found, restart Newton's method with the original polynomial, and this approximate root as starting value.

However, there is no warranty that this will allow finding all roots. In fact, the problem of finding the roots of a polynomial from its coefficients can be highly ill-conditioned. This is illustrated by 
Wilkinson's polynomial: the roots of this polynomial of degree 20 are the 20 first positive integers; changing the last bit of the 32-bit representation of one of its coefficient (equal to –210) produces a polynomial with only 10 real roots and 10 complex roots with imaginary parts larger than 0.6.

Closely related to Newton's method are Halley's method and Laguerre's method. Both use the polynomial and its two first derivations for an iterative process that has a cubic convergence. Combining two consecutive steps of these methods into a single test, one gets a rate of convergence of 9, at the cost of 6 polynomial evaluations (with Horner rule). On the other hand, combining three steps of Newtons method gives a rate of convergence of 8 at the cost of the same number of polynomial evaluation. This gives a slight advantage to these methods (less clear for Laguerre's method, as a square root has to be computed at each step).

When applying these methods to polynomials with real coefficients and real starting points, Newton's and Halley's method stay inside the real number line. One has to choose complex starting points to find complex roots. In contrast, the Laguerre method with a square root in its evaluation will leave the real axis of its own accord.

Finding roots in pairs
If the given polynomial only has real coefficients, one may wish to avoid computations with complex numbers. To that effect, one has to find quadratic factors for pairs of conjugate complex roots. The application of the multidimensional Newton's method to this task results in Bairstow's method.

The real variant of Jenkins–Traub algorithm is an improvement of this method.

Finding all roots at once
The simple Durand–Kerner and the slightly more complicated Aberth method simultaneously find all of the roots using only simple complex number arithmetic. Accelerated algorithms for multi-point evaluation and interpolation similar to the fast Fourier transform can help speed them up for large degrees of the polynomial. It is advisable to choose an asymmetric, but evenly distributed set of initial points. The implementation of this method in the free software MPSolve is a reference for its efficiency and its accuracy.

Another method with this style is the Dandelin–Gräffe method (sometimes also ascribed to Lobachevsky), which uses polynomial transformations to repeatedly and implicitly square the roots. This greatly magnifies variances in the roots. Applying Viète's formulas, one obtains easy approximations for the modulus of the roots, and with some more effort, for the roots themselves.

Exclusion and enclosure methods 
Several fast tests exist that tell if a segment of the real line or a region of the complex plane contains no roots. By bounding the modulus of the roots and recursively subdividing the initial region indicated by these bounds, one can isolate small regions that may contain roots and then apply other methods to locate them exactly.

All these methods involve finding the coefficients of shifted and scaled versions of the polynomial. For large degrees, FFT-based accelerated methods become viable.

For real roots, see next sections.

The Lehmer–Schur algorithm uses the Schur–Cohn test for circles; a variant, Wilf's global bisection algorithm uses a winding number computation for rectangular regions in the complex plane.

The splitting circle method uses FFT-based polynomial transformations to find large-degree factors corresponding to clusters of roots. The precision of the factorization is maximized using a Newton-type iteration. This method is useful for finding the roots of polynomials of high degree to arbitrary precision; it has almost optimal complexity in this setting.

Real-root isolation 

Finding the real roots of a polynomial with real coefficients is a problem that has received much attention since the beginning of 19th century, and is still an active domain of research. Most root-finding algorithms can find some real roots, but cannot certify having found all the roots. Methods for finding all complex roots, such as Aberth method can provide the real roots. However, because of the numerical instability of polynomials (see Wilkinson's polynomial), they may need arbitrary-precision arithmetic for deciding which roots are real. Moreover, they compute all complex roots when only few are real.

It follows that the standard way of computing real roots is to compute first disjoint intervals, called isolating intervals, such that each one contains exactly one real root, and together they contain all the roots. This computation is called real-root isolation. Having isolating interval, one may use fast numerical methods, such as Newton's method for improving the precision of the result.

The oldest complete algorithm for real-root isolation results from Sturm's theorem. However, it appears to be much less efficient than the methods based on Descartes' rule of signs and Vincent's theorem. These methods divide into two main classes, one using continued fractions and the other using bisection. Both method have been dramatically improved since the beginning of 21st century. With these improvements they reach a computational complexity that is similar to that of the best algorithms for computing all the roots (even when all roots are real).

These algorithms have been implemented and are available in Mathematica (continued fraction method) and Maple (bisection method). Both implementations can routinely find the real roots of polynomials of degree higher than 1,000.

Finding multiple roots of polynomials

Numerical computation of multiple roots 

Multiple roots are highly sensitive, known to be ill-conditioned and inaccurate in numerical computation in general. A method by 
Zhonggang Zeng (2004), implemented as a MATLAB package, computes multiple roots and corresponding multiplicities of a polynomial accurately even if the coefficients are inexact.

The method can be summarized in two steps. Let  be the given polynomial. The first step determines the multiplicity structure by applying square-free factorization with a numerical greatest common divisor algorithm. This allows writing   as

where  are the multiplicities of the distinct roots. The least squares solution  is no longer ill-conditioned in most cases. The second step applies the Gauss-Newton algorithm to solve the overdetermined system for the distinct roots.

The sensitivity of multiple roots can be regularized due to a geometric property of multiple roots discovered by William Kahan (1972) and the overdetermined system model  maintains the multiplicities .

Square-free factorization 

For polynomials whose coefficients are exactly given as integers or rational numbers, there is an efficient method to factorize them into factors that have only simple roots and whose coefficients are also exactly given. This method, called square-free factorization, is based on the multiple roots of a polynomial being the roots of the greatest common divisor of the polynomial and its derivative.

The square-free factorization of a polynomial p is a factorization  where each  is either 1 or a polynomial without multiple roots, and two different  do not have any common root.

An efficient method to compute this factorization is Yun's algorithm.

References 

Polynomials 
Root-finding algorithms